Liam Shotton (born 28 May 1987) is an English footballer who plays as a striker. He plays for Tiong Bahru FC in the National Football League Division 1, the second tier of Singapore football.

Career
Having played in non-League football in England, Shotton joined S. League side Hougang United in January 2013. He went on to make 28 appearances in all competitions for Hougang, scoring five times.

Personal life
He is the elder brother of Middlesbrough player Ryan Shotton.

References

1987 births
Living people
English footballers
Association football forwards
English expatriate footballers
Kidsgrove Athletic F.C. players
Nantwich Town F.C. players
Stafford Rangers F.C. players
Singapore Premier League players
Northern Premier League players
Expatriate footballers in Singapore
Hougang United FC players
Leek Town F.C. players
Tampines Rovers FC players